Cathal Cormack (born 1995) is an Irish hurler. At the club level he plays with Blackrock, while he is also a member of the Cork senior hurling team.

Career

Cormack first played hurling at juvenile and underage levels with the Blackrock club, while also playing as a schoolboy with St. Francis College in Rochestown. His underage career began with three successive Cork MHC titles. He was still eligible for the minor grade when he won the first of three Cork PU21HC titles. By this stage, Cormack had joined the Blackrock senior team. He was joint-captain of the team that won the Cork PSHC title after a defeat of Glen Rovers in the 2020 final.

Cormack first appeared on the inter-county scene as captain of the Cork minor hurling team in 2013. He later lined out with the under-21 team in 2016. Cormack was also drafted onto the senior team for that year's National League as a member of the extended panel. After a number of years away from the team, he was recalled under new manager Pat Ryan in advance of the 2023 season.

Career statistics

Honours

Blackrock
Cork Premier Senior Hurling Championship: 2020 (jc)
Cork Premier Under-21 A Hurling Championship: 2012, 2014, 2015
Cork Minor Hurling Championship: 2011, 2012, 2013

Cork
Munster Senior Hurling League: 2023

References

1995 births
Living people
UCC hurlers
Blackrock National Hurling Club hurlers
Cork inter-county hurlers